Zorica Ðurković (born 14 September 1957) is a former basketball player who competed for Yugoslavia in the 1980 Summer Olympics.

References

1957 births
Living people
Basketball players from Dubrovnik
Serbs of Croatia
Olympic basketball players of Yugoslavia
Basketball players at the 1980 Summer Olympics
Olympic bronze medalists for Yugoslavia
Olympic medalists in basketball
Serbian women's basketball players
ŽKK Crvena zvezda players
Yugoslav women's basketball players
Shooting guards
Medalists at the 1980 Summer Olympics